Mamuka is a Georgian given name. It may refer to
Mamuka of Imereti (fl. 1719–1769), member of the Bagrationi dynasty of Imereti
Prince Mamuka of Imereti (died 1654), member of the Bagrationi dynasty of Imereti
Mamuka, Prince of Mukhrani (died 1751), Georgian prince
Mamuka Gorgodze (born 1984), Georgian rugby union player
Mamuka Japharidze (born 1962), Georgian artist
Mamuka Jugeli (born 1969), Georgian football player and manager 
Mamuka Kikaleishvili (1960–2000), Georgian actor 
Mamuka Kikalishvili (born 1971), Georgian fashion photographer
Mamuka Kobakhidze (born 1992), Georgian football player
Mamuka Kurashvili (born 1970), Georgian general 
Mamuka Lomidze (born 1984), Georgian football player
Mamuka Machavariani (born 1970), Georgian football player
Mamuka Magrakvelidze (born 1977), a Georgian rugby union player
Mamuka Minashvili (born 1971), Georgian football player
Mamuka Tavakalashvili, Georgian poet, painter and calligrapher of the 17th century 
Mamuka Tsereteli (born 1979), Georgian football player 

Georgian masculine given names